Hollandichthys is a genus of characins endemic to rivers and streams in southern and southeastern Brazil from Rio Grande do Sul to Rio de Janeiro. The currently recognized species in this genus are:
 Hollandichthys multifasciatus (C. H. Eigenmann & A. A. Norris, 1900)
 Hollandichthys taramandahy Bertaco & L. R. Malabarba, 2013

Genus named for zoologist-paleontologist William J. Holland (1848-1932), Director of the Carnegie Museums of Pittsburgh.

References

Characidae
Taxa named by Carl H. Eigenmann